"Paper Thin" is the third single from MC Lyte's debut album Lyte as a Rock. It is produced by King of Chill, who along with Lyte has songwriting credits.

The song, which is about Lyte confronting her boyfriend over infidelity, became an underground hit, selling 125,000 copies in the first six months with virtually no radio play.

In 2003, The Source placed Paper Thin  24  in their list "Top 151 Rap Songs of All-Time". In April 2013, the song was included  8 on Complex's "The 50 Best Rap Songs by Women" list. Paper Thin was ranked  23 on About.com's The 100 Best Rap Songs of All Time list.

The song has also been covered/reinterpreted by other rappers like Bahamadia, Puff Daddy and Missy Elliott.

Conception and composition 
In an interview with Rolling Stone, MC Lyte says she wrote the lyrics to "Paper Thin" in her rhyme book long before recorded the song "probably '82" at 12 or 13 years old. Lyte also tells that the lyrics are not based on her own personal experiences.

"Paper Thin" was produced by King of Chill of the rap group Alliance, who also has songwriting credits. According to an interview with King of Chill in 2019, the initial production work was done in his family's apartment with a Alesis drum machine, and followed by mixing at Firehouse Studio in Brooklyn Heights. The producer has also stated that the success of the song was a "dream come true"

Samples 
The song contains samples of Prince's "17 Days" guitar riff, Al Green's "I'm Glad You're Mine"'s drum, and Earth, Wind & Fire's "Shining Star" hook. The song also has a chorus interpolation from Ray Charles' "Hit the Road Jack", in which Lyte changes "Jack" to "Sam."

Music video 
The music video for the song, directed by Lionel C. Martin, was filmed at the New York Transit Museum in Brooklyn and features cameos by, among others the clothing designer urban April Walker, D-Nice, DJ Jazzy Joyce, MC Serch of the rap group 3rd Bass and their DJ K-Rock.

During an interview with Rolling Stone Lyte commented on the making of the video "It was fun. It was a quick shoot. We probably went from about 9 in the morning till about 7. It was very different from 'Lyte As a Rock,' because 'Lyte As a Rock' was a 24-hour video. We worked 24 hours around the clock for that video 'cause there were so many different setups. But with 'Paper Thin' it was quite simple. Had a train full of people that that I knew and that were very supportive of my career, so they came in."

In the book Icons of Hip Hop: An Encyclopedia of the Movement, Music, and Culture (2007), the writer Jennifer R. Young would comment on the video:

It was included on her compilation video album Lyte Years (1991).

Appearances
"Paper Thin" was included in her compilation albums The Very Best of MC Lyte (2001), The Shit I Never Dropped (2003), Rhyme Masters (2005), and Cold Rock a Party - Best Of MC Lyte (2019). The single has also been reissued in 2003.

In 1996, Bahamadia recorded a cover of the song.

MF Doom has made a remix of the song on his remix album Special Blends Volume 1 & 2 (2004).

MC Lyte performed this song in her tribute at the 2006 VH1 Hip Hop Honors.

Legacy and influence

Critical reception 
In the book That's the Joint !: The Hip Hop Study Reader (2003), sociologist Tricia Rose commented on the song:

Hip hop magazine The Source joked that the song "Introduced toe sucking to an unwitting generation" In June 2012, WQHT's Peter Rosenberg would review the song for Complex commenting "Classic beat, classic Lyte.(...) MC Lyte is the number one female MC of all time. And it’s exemplified of ‘Paper Thin" For the same media Rob Kenner reviewed "MC Lyte is one of the greatest rappers of any gender in hip-hop history ( ...) Aside from the battle rap "10% Dis," the album's standout track was this song, in which Lyte puts a two-timing loverboy in check. Unconcerned with inflaming her listeners' sexual urges, Lyte was always confident that her lyrics were more than enough."

On the 30th anniversary of its release, Albumism'''s Jesse Ducker reviewed "Lyte as a Rock," in which he commented on the song:

Henry Adaso of About.com rated that with Paper Thin Lyte "solidified her status as the new queen in town." In 2018, thirty years after its publication, Christopher R. Weingarten of Rolling Stone magazine reviewed "Paper Thin", calling it an "iconic hip-hop hit" and "Machismo-slaying anthem." For his part, Troy Smith from Cleveland.com would write in 2021 "MC Lyte was the first female emcee who could hang with the boys. That was clear from her lyrical talent. But she took things to the next level on 'Paper Thin', a song that smacks down egotistical men in epic fashion."

 Accolades 

Samples

In 1992, X-Clan sampled the song on "Holy Rum Swig" from their album Xodus.
In February 1993, English boyband Take That sampled "Paper Thin" on their single "Why Can't I Wake Up with You".
 In September 1993, De La Soul interpolated the song in "Area" on their album Buhloone Mindstate. In the third verse, Posdnuos sings "A-hah, a-hah, a-hah/Sucker you missed, I put all feelings aside, I know who I am" changing it to "A-hah, a-hah, a-hah/(We whooped that ass) And put the feelings aside, I know who I am".
In 1999 was sampled by Puff Daddy on his song with Redman "Fake Thugs Dedication" from his album Forever''.
In 2003, Missy Elliott rewrote "Paper Thin" for her verse in her collaboration with Timbaland & Magoo on the single "Cop That Shit".

Single track listing

12" Vinyl

A-Side
 "Paper Thin" (Radio Version) (5:00)
 "Paper Thin" (Remix) (2:55)
Produced by Audio Two
 "Paper Thin" (Remix) (3:25)
Produced by Alliance

B-Side
 "Paper Thin" (Instrumental) (2:53)
 "Paper Thin" (Acapella) (2:25)
 "Spare The Rod" (4:26)

Personnel
Credits are taken from the liner notes.
Written By – MC Lyte (tracks A1 to B2), First Priority Crew (tracks: B3), King Of Chill (tracks: A1 to B2) 
Producer – King Of Chill
Mastered By – Carlton Batts (CSB)
Executive Producer – Nat Robinson

References

1988 singles
MC Lyte songs
1988 songs
Atlantic Records singles
Songs written by MC Lyte